Paul Lindpaintner (22 May 1883 – 23 April 1969) was a German tennis player. He competed in the men's outdoor singles event at the 1912 Summer Olympics.

References

1883 births
1969 deaths
German male tennis players
Olympic tennis players of Germany
Tennis players at the 1912 Summer Olympics
Place of birth missing